Katodinium is a genus of dinoflagellates belonging to the family Tovelliaceae.

The genus was first described by Fott in 1957.

Species:
 Katodinium glaucum
 Katodinium rotundatum

References

Gymnodiniales
Dinoflagellate genera